The Train of Suicides (French: Le train des suicidés) is a 1931 French mystery film directed by Edmond T. Gréville and starring Vanda Gréville, Georges Colin and Blanche Bernis.

Cast
 Vanda Gréville as Betty Gold 
 Georges Colin as Joe Crackett 
 Blanche Bernis as Mrs. Crackett 
 Robert Vidalin as Harry Butler 
 Georges Péclet as Fergusson 
 François Viguier as Flypaper 
 Simone Bourday as Mary Strafford 
 Andrée Standart as Lily Bonzo 
 Germaine Aussey as L'employée 
 Robert Périer as Un jeune homme 
 Pedro Elviro as Nobody 
 Jean De Sevin as Pussy 
 René Ferté as John Sparks 
 Raymond Blot as Josuah Brown

References

Bibliography 
 Dudley Andrew. Mists of Regret: Culture and Sensibility in Classic French Film. Princeton University Press, 1995.

External links 
 

1931 films
French mystery films
1931 mystery films
1930s French-language films
Films directed by Edmond T. Gréville
Films based on French novels
French black-and-white films
1930s French films